Pumamarka (Aymara and Quechua puma cougar, puma, marka village, "puma village", is an archaeological park in Peru. It is located in the Cusco Region, Cusco Province, San Sebastián District, on the left side of the river Pumamarka. The site was declared a National Cultural Heritage (Patrimonio Cultural) of Peru by the National Institute of Culture.

See also 
 Inkill Tampu
 Ollantaytambo
 Rumiwasi

References

Archaeological sites in Cusco Region
Archaeological sites in Peru